Tawata Productions is contemporary Māori and Pasifika performing arts company established in 2004 based in Te Whanganui-a-Tara (Wellington), New Zealand. They produce theatre, screen and digital work as well as the festivals: Kia Mau, Breaking Ground and the Pūtahi Festival. Tawata showcases work by Māori, Pasifika and Indigenous writers and makers and is led by Hone Kouka and Mīria George.

About 

Tawata Productions was founded by playwrights and directors Mīria George and Hone Kouka in 2004 and their home base is Te Whanganui-a-Tara, Wellington.

Tawata Productions produce and tour theatre productions. Productions include I,George Nepia (2011, by Hone Kouka), about rugby legend George Nēpia, He Reo Aroha, by Mīria George and Jamie McCaskill, The Prospect by Maraea Rakuraku, and Hui by Mitch Tawhi-Thomas.     

Tawata are invested in promoting, producing and developing work, to this end they have started several events. In 2010 they created an annual festival called the Matariki Festival, first held at Circa Theatre, Matariki is the Māori New Year in midwinter. The Matariki Festival had a development programme that since has been renamed as Breaking Ground. Breaking Ground is a festival of new writing and ideas curated and produced by Tawata Productions. Kouka and George were inspired by a development dance festival hosted by Native Earth Performing Arts in Canada.  The first plays workshopped at Breaking Ground in 2010 were Hui by Mitch Tawhi Thomas, The Prospect by Maraea Rakuraku and Taikaha by Hinekaa Mako. The Matariki Festival won Tawata Productions the Critics’ Wildcard award in 2015 at the Wellington Theatre Awards.  

In 2011 Breaking Ground expanded with First Nation Canadian playwrights Yvette Nolan and Tara Beagan attended.  Other artists who have had their writing workshopped and presented at Breaking Ground include Nancy Brunning in 2018 with Kingdom of Women, Sherilee Kahui, Victor Rodger, Barbara Hostelek, and Jordy Gregg (Tasmania). The workshops involve directors and dramaturgs such as Briar Grace-Smith, Rīwia Brown and Nathaniel Lees. 

The Kia Mau Festival, formally the Ahi Kaa Festival, is a contemporary Indigenous theatre and dance festival held in Te Whanganui-a-Tara. It was initiated in 2015 by Tawata to platform Māori, Pasifika theatre and dance companies and to address the lack of programming for these companies in established theatres and festivals. Some companies that have presented work at the Kia Mau Festival include Hāpai Productions, Modern Māori Quartet, Taki Rua Productions, Agaram Productions, The Māori Sidesteps, Atamira Dance Company, Okareka Dance Company and Te Rēhia Theatre.

The Pūtahi Festival is for emerging practitioners to test and show works to an audience. It started in 2013 and for the first few years was held at Studio 77, the Theatre Department of Victoria University of Wellington. In 2021 it ran over nine days.

Selected productions

References

External links 

  https://tawataproductions.com/
  

Theatre in New Zealand
Theatre companies in New Zealand